Athmiya Rajan is an Indian actress who works predominantly in Malayalam- and Tamil-language films.

Personal life 
Athmiya was born in Kannur, Kerala. She completed her graduation in Nursing from Shree Devi College of Nursing, Mangalore. She married Sanoop K Nambiar on 25 January 2021 at Kannur.

Career 
Athmiya's first film as the lead actress came in Tamil film Manam Kothi Paravai in which she played a village belle opposite Sivakarthikeyan. She then played the lead in Ranjan Pramod's Rose Guitarinaal were she essayed the role of an airline trainee, an innocent girl caught between two lovers. Malathi Rangarajan of The Hindu in a film review of Manam Kothi Paravai stated that "New-find Athmiya conveys a lot with her expressive eyes. Her role has substance, and she carries it off well". In 2014, she appeared in Pongadi Neengalum Unga Kadhalum followed by Amoeba in 2016 were she played one of the victims. Her next movie was in Tamil titled Kaaviyyan. She then portrayed lead roles Joseph (2018) and Maarconi Mathaai (2019).

Filmography

Awards and nominations

References

External links 
 

Actresses from Kerala
Actresses in Malayalam cinema
Actresses in Tamil cinema
Indian film actresses
Indian Hindus
Living people
Tamil actresses
Year of birth missing (living people)